Phạm Văn Luân (born 26 May 1999) is a Vietnamese footballer who plays as a midfielder for V.League 1 club Hanoi Police.

Career statistics

Club

References

1999 births
Living people
Vietnamese footballers
Association football midfielders
V.League 1 players
Khanh Hoa FC players
Can Tho FC players
Saigon FC players
FC Ryukyu players
Vietnamese expatriate footballers
Vietnamese expatriate sportspeople in Japan
Expatriate footballers in Japan